Fillières is a surname. Notable people with the surname include: 

Hélène Fillières (born 1972), French actress, film director and screenwriter
Sophie Fillières (born 1964), French film director and screenwriter

French-language surnames